Marion Township is a township in Clayton County, Iowa, USA.  As of the 2000 census, its population was 389.

Geography
According to the USGS, it contains five cemeteries: Apostolic, Cook, Houg, Marion Lutheran and Mork.

The streams of Deer Creek and Sand Creek run through this township.

References
 USGS Geographic Names Information System (GNIS)

External links
 US-Counties.com
 City-Data.com

Townships in Clayton County, Iowa
Townships in Iowa